The Guangzhou–Heyuan high-speed railway is a planned railway line in Guangdong, China.

Route
The line starts at Guangzhou North railway station and heads east. Stops are planned at Baiyun Airport Terminal 3, Conghua, Yonghan, and Longmen. The eastern terminus will be Heyuan East. The line is planned as part of a new high-speed rail channel between Zhanjiang and Meizhou.

References

High-speed railway lines in China